Coxs Corner, New Jersey may refer to:
Coxs Corner, Burlington County, New Jersey
Coxs Corner, Mercer County, New Jersey
Coxs Corner, Monmouth County, New Jersey